Damao may refer to:

 Daman, India, a city in Dadra and Nagar Haveli and Daman and Diu, India
 Former name of Minxiong, a rural township in Chiayi County, Taiwan